Cameahwait was the brother of Sacagawea, and a Shoshone chief.  He was the head of the first group of inhabitants of modern-day Idaho who were encountered by Europeans.

Cameahwait met Meriwether Lewis and three other members of the Lewis and Clark Expedition on August 13, 1805.  He then accompanied Lewis across the Lemhi Pass to meet Clark.  Sacagawea was with Clark's party and recognized Cameahwait as her brother.

To the Shoshoni Cameahwait and Sacagawea were brother and sister.  However, in Shoshoni language cousin and brother are the same word, indicating the tribe thinks of them as the same. Consequently, during the translation, when Sacagawea cried out that she recognized Cameahwait as her brother, that is what she meant, but whether they actually had the same father, let alone the same mother, is unclear.

Cameahwait donated horses to Lewis and Clark to repay them for reuniting him with his long-lost sister. She and her friend Otter Woman had been kidnapped by the Hidatsa Indians when Sacagawea was twelve years old and used as slaves for the Hidatsas. They were then sold to Toussaint Charbonneau, a French-Canadian trapper. Charbonneau and Sacagawea both accompanied Lewis and Clark on their western expedition in 1805. Earlier in the year in February, she gave birth to Jean Baptiste Charbonneau (Pompy) at Fort Mandan in present-day North Dakota.

Death
Cameahwait was killed during a battle with the Blackfeet at Bloody Creek in Montana, at an uncertain date.  It is believed he was buried on a butte between the towns of Lemhi and Tendoy, Idaho.

References

Native American leaders
Lewis and Clark Expedition people
Pre-statehood history of Idaho
Sacagawea
Shoshone people
19th-century Native Americans